Pseudotalara is a genus of moths of the family Yponomeutidae. The Global Lepidoptera Names Index lists it as a synonym of Eustixis.

Species
Pseudotalara chrysippa - Druce, 1885 

Yponomeutidae